Bożena Bąk (born 28 January 1966) is a Polish badminton player. She competed in women's singles and women's doubles at the 1992 Summer Olympics in Barcelona.

References

External links

1966 births
Living people
Polish female badminton players
Olympic badminton players of Poland
Badminton players at the 1992 Summer Olympics
People from Głubczyce